Death Note: The Musical is a musical based on the Japanese manga series of the same name by Tsugumi Ohba and Takeshi Obata. The score is by Frank Wildhorn, with lyrics by Jack Murphy and book by Ivan Menchell.

Development for the musical was announced in December 2013. The musical had its world premiere on April 6, 2015 at the Nissay Theatre in Tokyo, Japan, with a Korean production opening the following July, running through August, at the Opera House of Seongnam Arts Center in Seoul.

Plot

Act I 
Light Yagami is a genius high school student in Tokyo, Japan, who despises criminals. He expresses his frustrations to his teacher, his classmates rallying to his side as he proclaims the failures of the justice system ("Where is the Justice?"). Meanwhile, two Shinigami ("gods of death") named Ryuk and Rem discuss how pitiful humans are, before Ryuk, seeking entertainment, drops a supernatural notebook called the "Death Note" into the human world ("They're Only Human"). Light finds it in the street and jokingly writes the name of a criminal that is currently holding a group of children hostage ("Change the World"). When the criminal dies, Light is initially horrified - until his hatred of criminals prompts him to use the Death Note to rid the world of crime, beginning a series of murders that quickly attracts the attention of the police ("Hurricane"). Following this, Chief Soichiro Yagami reluctantly proposes that they enlist the enigmatic but unorthodox detective known only as L.

Whilst Light flicks through the Death Note in his room, Ryuk appears and identifies himself as the notebook's original owner. He reveals that he will write Light's name inside when it's his time to die and that only those who have touched the Death Note can see him - as demonstrated when Light's little sister, Sayu, bursts into the room, completely oblivious to Ryuk's presence. When she leaves, Light reveals his plans to become the world's savior, using the internet to show Ryuk that people have joyously labelled the killings the work of "Kira" (derived from "killer"). Ryuk, amused that the people's "hero" is no more than a bratty teenager, reveals that he didn't choose Light for the task and merely dropped the Death Note out of boredom ("Kira"). Subsequently, Light and Sayu attends the concert of famous idol Misa Amane, who dedicates her performance to Kira ("I'm Ready"). Afterwards, when Sayu mentions that she believes Kira's actions are wrong, Light asks what she would say to Kira if she met him. He is left stunned by her response - she would tell him to stop, declaring that he should follow her brother's example, whilst Misa muses over how much she idolizes Kira ("We All Need a Hero").

Returning home, Light watches an Interpol broadcast in which L reveals himself and vows to capture Kira, causing Light to write his name in the Death Note. However, this turns out to be a trap; after the man dies, the real L's voice enters, explaining that his stand-in was a criminal scheduled for execution. Ending the broadcast with the deduction that Kira is in the Kantō region, L ponders their oncoming battle, realizing that his opponent is a high school student ("The Game Begins"). Reeling after carelessly falling into L's trap, Light tries to learn more about the Death Note from Ryuk, wondering how far he can manipulate the details of a person's death. Soichiro, now revealed to be Light's father, enters the room and discusses the case with his son, mentioning L's deduction from the schedule of murders that Kira is a student. Soichiro then declares that L was wrong to sacrifice his stand-in during the broadcast, advising Light to be as righteous as possible whilst unaware that he is Kira ("There Are Lines").

Whilst L deduces that Kira needs a name and a face to kill, Light asks Ryuk, who can see someone's name above their heads, to tell him L's name should they ever meet him. Ryuk instead offers to give Light his own "Shinigami Eyes" in exchange for half of his remaining lifespan. Rebuffing the deal, Light changes the schedule of murders, revealing Kira's connection to the police and forcing L to probe his own investigation team. Confident that the task force will retaliate by finding and exposing L's identity, Light ponders with his opponent the outcome of their game ("Secrets and Lies"). Afterwards, a news broadcast announces that the FBI have sent several agents to Japan, prompting Light to find the identity of one agent, Haley Belle, on his fiancée's social media profiles. Writing Belle's name in the notebook, Light specifies that they meet at Shinjuku Station, where the agent writes the names of his colleagues onto a Death Note scrap before committing suicide ("Hurricane (Reprise)").

Upon learning the deaths of the FBI agents, the task force is torn between their duty to capture Kira and fear of being killed. Soichiro gives each man the opportunity to leave, prompting one to quit the case ("Change the World (Reprise)"). Light and L listen from different locations as the citizens praise Kira, with the detective vowing to bring him to justice. Suddenly, a second Death Note falls from the sky and is discovered by Misa, who has fled from a stalker's clutches ("Where is the Justice? (Reprise)").

Act II 
After the crowd praises Kira once more ("Where is the Justice? (Reprise)"), Rem appears before Misa. She reveals that the newly dropped Death Note belonged to a Shinigami named Gelus who broke the Shinigami code by saving Misa from her stalker and promptly turned to sand. Explaining that Kira punished the man who murdered her parents, Misa begs a reluctant Rem to give her Shinigami Eyes so she can assist him ("Mortals and Fools"). Meanwhile, the task force admits to Soichiro their lack of trust in L, including their suspicion that he is really Kira. L then appears before them and offers his own suspect - Light Yagami. Vowing to investigate him closely, he meets the young genius in college, catching him off-guard by revealing himself to be L. Whilst the pair plot each other's downfall, Misa writes a new song declaring in subtext her devotion to Kira ("Stalemate"). As she records it, she sends a message to a TV station as "the Second Kira", begging to meet the original in Shibuya, which disturbs Light but amuses Ryuk ("I’ll Only Love You More"). This message also forces L to accept the impossible, including the likelihood that Shinigami exist ("The Way Things Are").

The next day in Shibuya, news of the two Kiras is met with joy by the people, hopeful that the pair will join forces ("Where is the Justice?(Reprise)"). Afterwards, Light and Misa meet and introduce their Shinigami to one another. When Misa begs him to become her boyfriend in exchange for her help, Light manipulates her into revealing the name of a task force member following them, much to Rem's horror. After agreeing to meet on the college campus, they leave Ryuk and Rem to ponder the situation, with Ryuk warning Rem about getting too attached to Misa ("Mortals and Fools (Reprise)"). Later, L's continued assertions of Light's guilt results in a heated argument with Soichiro, ending with the revelation that the officer who tailed Light has committed suicide. Convinced that the two Kiras are working together, L leaves Soichiro to question his faith in his son ("Honor Bound").

Back at college, L challenges Light to a set of tennis, the intensity of their mental battle boiling over into the match ("Playing His Game"). After winning, Light probes L about his suspicions, at which point Misa arrives. Light introduces her to L, allowing Misa to see the latter's real name ("Playing His Game (Reprise)"). However, L has her arrested before she can reveal what she knows, having found evidence on the envelope sent to the TV station that ties her to the Second Kira. Blindfolding her and chaining her to a cross, L tries to force Misa into confessing, but she refuses. Appalled, Soichiro predicts that L will pay for torturing Misa and reaffirms his belief in Light ("Borrowed Time"). Rem then enters Misa's cell, offering to erase her memory of the Death Note so that she won't betray Light. Misa agrees, leaving Rem heartbroken ("When Love Comes"). Rem then finds Light and Ryuk, at which point Light talks her into writing L's name in the Death Note. Anticipating this, Rem agrees and orchestrates L's death as Light specifies, ultimately sacrificing herself to save Misa.

With the stage set for the final showdown, L goes to meet Light in an abandoned warehouse on Daikoku Wharf ("The Way Things Are (Reprise)"). Upon arrival, L holds Light at gunpoint, whereupon the latter confesses to his crimes and reveals both his Death Note and Ryuk. Light then declares his victory, as L's name has already been written by Rem ("The Way It Ends"). L shoots his foe, but this is part of Light's plan - he will tell Soichiro that L was the real Kira and tried to kill him, thus allowing him to join and ultimately manipulate the task force as he sees fit. However, L warns Light that the game has not yet finished before being compelled to commit suicide by the Death Note. As Ryuk congratulates Light, he laments that life will return to a boring routine without L to challenge him, and writes Light's name in the Death Note as the latter begs to be spared, declaring himself, "God of the New World" before he dies ("Hurricane (Reprise)"). Remarking that everyone's efforts were meaningless, Ryuk departs with the Death Note.

As the people mourn the loss of Kira, Soichiro and Sayu find the bodies in the warehouse and are left without knowing what really happened to Light. Meanwhile, Misa finds Rem's remains and disperses them, marking the latter's death and the end of the story ("Requiem").

Productions 
Wildhorn was approached to write the musical back in 2013, and prior to this, he had not heard about the series until his son convinced him to accept. The musical received a New York workshop in April 2014 in anticipation of the Tokyo premiere. The New York workshop cast included Andy Kelso, Robert Cuccioli and Adrienne Warren. An English concept album was recorded in December 2014 featuring Jeremy Jordan as Light, Jarrod Spector as L, Eric Anderson as Ryuk, Carrie Manolakos as Rem, Michael Lanning as Soichiro, Adrienne Warren as Misa, and Laura Osnes as Sayu. Eight songs from the album were released online in early 2015. Despite the show originally being written in English, no English-language production of the show has been announced.

The musical premiered on April 6, 2015 and ran until April 29, 2015 at the Nissay Theatre in Tokyo, Japan, with Kenji Urai and Hayato Kakizawa sharing the role of Light, Teppei Koike as L, Kotaro Yoshida  as Ryuk, Fuka Yuzuki as Misa, Megumi Hamada as Rem, Takeshi Kaga as Soichiro, and Ami Maeshima as Sayu.

A Korean production ran in Seoul from July 11, 2015 to August 11, 2015. The Korean production sported an entirely new cast, and featured Hong Kwang-ho as Light and Kim Junsu as L.

The Korean production is set to open again at the Opera Theater of the Seoul Arts Center, running from January 3 to January 26, 2017. The majority of the roles will be played by the same actors from the Premiere production, save for the roles of Light and Misa; which will be taken over by musical actor Han Ji-Sang, and pop singer, BEN. It was announced that this production of Death Note would be Kim Junsu's last performance before he began his mandatory military service in the South Korean army. From July 21, 2017 to July 23, 2017, a short 4-show run was performed at the National Taichung Theater in Taichung, Taiwan featuring much of the cast from the Tokyo production, subtitled in Chinese.

Another Japanese tour, which will act as a potential springboard for future international productions, premiered on January 20, 2020, at the Toshima Ward Arts & Culture Theater in Tokyo. This production features Ryouta Murai and Shouma Kai as Light, Fu Takahashi as L, Sakura Kiryu as Misa, Eiji Yokota as Ryuk, Park Hye-na, reprising her role from the Korean productions, as Rem, Kiyotaka Imai as Soichiro, and Hirari Nishida as Sayu, and is directed by Tamiya Kuriyama, reprising his role from helming the previous Japanese and Korean productions.

A Russian concert performance premiered on April 17, 2021 at the MIR Concert Hall, directed by Anton Presnov and Mariam Barskaya.

A Brazilian academic adaptation started run in July 20, 2022 at the Clara Nunes Theater, Rio de Janeiro.

Songs

Act I
 "Overture" — Company
 "Where is the Justice?" — Light, Teacher, Students
 "They're Only Human" — Ryuk, Rem
 "Change the World" — Light, Company
 "Hurricane" — Light
 "Kira" — Ryuk, Company
 "I'm Ready" — Misa, Backup Singers
 "We All Need a Hero" — Sayu, Misa
 "The Game Begins" — L 
 "There Are Lines" — Soichiro, Light
 "Secrets and Lies" — L, Soichiro, Light
 "Hurricane (Reprise)" — Light
 "Change the World (Reprise)" — Cops
 "Where is the Justice? (Reprise)" — Light, L, Misa, Company 

Brazilian Production

Act I
 "Abertura" — "Elenco"
 "Onde Está a Justiça?" — "Light, Professor, Estudantes"
 "Só Humanos" — "Ryuk, Rem"
 "Furacão" — "Light"
 "Kira" — "Ryuk, Elenco"
 "Estou Pronta" — "Misa, Misetes"
 "O Herói Que Eu Preciso" — "Sayu, Elenco"
 "O Jogo Começa" — "L"
 "Há Limites" — "Soichiro, Light"
 "Segredos E Ilusões" — "L, Soichiro, Light"
 "Furacão (Reprise)" — "Light, Elenco"
 "Mudar O Mundo" — "Policiais"
 "Onde Está A Justiça? (Reprise)" — "Light, L, Misa, Elenco"
Act II
 "Where is the Justice? (Reprise 2)" — Company 
 "Mortals and Fools" — Misa, Rem
 "Stalemate" — L, Light, Misa, Company
 "I'll Only Love You More" — Misa, Sayu
 "The Way Things Are" — L
 "Where is the Justice? (Reprise 3)" — Civilians
 "Mortals and Fools (Reprise)" — Rem, Ryuk
 "Honor Bound" — Soichiro
 "Playing His Game" — L, Light
 "Playing His Game (Reprise)" — Light
 "Borrowed Time" — Misa
 "When Love Comes" — Rem
 "The Way Things Are (Reprise)" — L
 "The Way It Ends" — L, Light
 "Hurricane (Reprise 2)" — Light
 "Requiem" — Company

Act II
 "Onde Está A Justiça? (Reprise 2)" — "Elenco"
 "Meros Mortais" — "Misa, Rem"
 "Impasse" — "L, Light, Misa"
 "Meros Mortais (Reprise)" — "Rem, Ryuk"
 "O Jogo É Seu" — "L, Light"
 "O Amor Vem" — "Rem"
 "Então É Esse O Final" — "L, Light"

Casts

Critical response 
The musical was one of the most highly anticipated musicals of the year in Japan and Korea. The Korean production received positive reviews from critics. Hong Kwang-ho and Kim Junsu were universally praised for their "powerhouse voices" and "brilliant, subtle acting;" while Park Hye-na and Kang Hong-suk, as the Shinigami Ryuk and Rem, were praised for "practically stealing the show." Wildhorn's score was also praised, while the story was criticized for trying to cram 12 volumes of the manga into a two-and-a-half hour musical. The staging was also criticized for being very simplistic and lacking in visual spectacle.

Sources

External links 
 "Death Note: The Musical - NY Sample Concept Album"

2015 musicals
Musicals by Frank Wildhorn
Musicals based on anime and manga
Death Note